Andrew Michael Peake (born 1 November 1961) is an English former professional footballer who made nearly 450 appearances in the Football League and Premier League playing as a midfielder.

Peake is a former England youth and under-21 international player.
After retiring from football, he spent 22 years as a police officer, leaving the force in 2016.

References

External links
 
 Sporting-heroes.net

1961 births
Living people
People from Market Harborough
Footballers from Leicestershire
English footballers
Association football midfielders
England under-21 international footballers
England youth international footballers
English Football League players
Premier League players
Leicester City F.C. players
Grimsby Town F.C. players
Charlton Athletic F.C. players
Middlesbrough F.C. players